The 2013 Asian Women's Volleyball Championship was the seventeenth edition of the Asian Championship, a biennial international volleyball tournament organised by the Asian Volleyball Confederation (AVC) with Thailand Volleyball Association (TVA). The tournament was held in Nakhon Ratchasima, Thailand from 13 to 21 September 2013.

Venues
Korat Chatchai Hall and MCC Hall, The Mall Nakhon Ratchasima, Nakhon Ratchasima, Thailand

Pools composition
The teams were seeded based on their final ranking at the 2011 Asian Women's Volleyball Championship.

Preliminary round

Pool A

|}

|}

Pool B

|}

|}

Pool C

|}

|}

Pool D

|}

|}

Classification round
  The results and the points of the matches between the same teams that were already played during the preliminary round shall be taken into account for the classification round.

Pool E

|}

|}

Pool F

|}

|}

Pool G

|}

|}

Pool H

|}

|}

Classification 13th–16th

Semifinals

|}

15th place

|}

13th place

|}

Classification 9th–12th

Semifinals

|}

11th place

|}

9th place

|}

Final round

Quarterfinals

|}

5th–8th semifinals

|}

Semifinals

|}

7th place

|}

5th place

|}

3rd place

|}

Final

|}

Final standing

Awards
MVP:  Wilavan Apinyapong
Best Scorer:  Kim Yeon-koung
Best Spiker:  Zhu Ting 
Best Blocker:  Xu Yunli 
Best Server:  Kim Yeon-koung
Best Setter:  Nootsara Tomkom
Best Libero:  Kim Hae-ran

References

External links
 Asian Volleyball Confederation

Volleyball,Asian Women's Championship
2013 in women's volleyball
2013
International volleyball competitions hosted by Thailand